Giuseppe Luciano Calogero "Peppe" Provenzano (born 23 July 1982) is an Italian politician and member of the Democratic Party. On 5 September 2019, he was appointed Minister for the South in the government of Giuseppe Conte. Provenzano is a meridionalist, and he is nicknamed "Peppe the Red" (Peppe il Rosso) for his left-wing politics.

References

1982 births
Living people
21st-century Italian politicians
Conte II Cabinet
Democratic Party (Italy) politicians